The Ngaku were an Australian Aboriginal tribe located around the Macleay River of New South Wales. They were a predominantly coastal people.
Although their language was not recorded, it was described as a dialect or accent of Dhanggati.

Country
On the coast it coast extended north from Point Plomer to Trial Bay. It covered the area from the Macleay River south to Rollands Plains. It ran northwards to Macksville and stretched inland near the Kemp Pinnacle Mountain. To their south were the Ngamba

People and history
Little is known of the Ngaku. Writing in 1929, A. R. Radcliffe-Brown stated that by that time the Ngaku were virtually extinct, descendants surviving only as a remnant together with people from the Ngamba tribe. Norman Tindale classified the Yarraharpny mentioned in one early account as a horde of the Ngaku.

One account by Henderson, writing in 1851 of the way clashes with the intrusive cedar-cutting gangs who began to work Ngaku territory, runs as follows:
On one occasion, during the illness of our former worthy commissioner, Mr. Oakes,
Mr. Sullivan, who was Commissioner of Crown Lands (Australia) Commissioner of Crown Lands, within the boundaries, went on an expedition against the Yarraharpny  blacks, a tribe notorious for their savage dispositions, and inhabiting the country between the mouths of the MacLeay and the  Nambuccoo. They had, at that time made an attack upon the sawyers occupied on the latter river, which had ended in the murder of one of these adventurous men, and this was not the first time that their aggressions had so ended. The commissioner, taking the police with him, came upon their camp, and dispersed them with some slaughter.
One crying baby was discovered hidden in a hole as the dispersed area of gunyahs was scoured. Its fate was not known. This was one of several massacres of the macLeay River tribes, at Wabra Station, Towel Creek, Henderson's Creek and Sheep Station Bluff, registered during the early colonial period recorded not only by Henderson but a local pioneer Mary McMaugh.

Alternative name
 Niungacko (This refers to the language of the group that once lived in and around Trial Bay).

Notes

Citations

Sources

Aboriginal peoples of New South Wales